Ilya Vasilyevich Postukhov (born 9 March 1999) is a Russian football player.

Club career
He made his debut in the Russian Football National League for FC Luch Vladivostok on 30 March 2019 in a game against FC Tambov.

References

External links
 
 Profile by Russian Football National League
 

1999 births
Living people
Russian footballers
Association football defenders
FC Luch Vladivostok players
FC Chita players